The CANT 22 was a flying boat airliner built in Italy in the 1920s and operated by Società Italiana Servizi Aerei (SISA) on their Adriatic routes. It was a conventional biplane design with unstaggered wings braced by Warren trusses. The three engines were mounted in nacelles carried in the interplane gap. Accommodation for passengers was provided within the hull, but the pilots sat in an open cockpit. Originally designed to carry eight passengers, an engine upgrade on later examples allowed the addition of two more seats.

Variants
 Cant 22 : Eight-passenger flying-boat airliner, powered by three 149 kW (200 hp) Isotta Fraschini piston engines.
 Cant 22R.1 : 10-passenger flying-boat airliner, powered by two 186 kW (250 hp) and one 380 kW (510 hp) Isotta-Fraschini piston engines.

Operators

 Società Italiana Servizi Aerei

Specifications (22R1)

See also

References

 
 aerei-italiani.net

cant 22
1920s Italian airliners
Flying boats
Trimotors
Biplanes